Hans College is a college in Jaipur.

External links
Hans College Website

Universities and colleges in Jaipur
Colleges in Rajasthan